Koksal Alver (Turkish: Köksal Alver) is a Turkish author who was born in Narman, a town and district of Erzurum, Turkey in 1970. His works primarily concern cultural dynamics, sociology of space and rural sociology. He is also an recognized expert in sociology of literature as a subfield of the sociology of culture. His literary works are inspired by traditional Ottoman poetry, which he composes in his own narrative styles.

Education and career

After completing high school education in the town, Alver went to Istanbul for studying sociology at Istanbul University. Alver began his academic career at the Faculty of Literature, Selçuk Üniversitesi, Konya and finally becomes a professor of the university. Alver continues giving a lecture at the same faculty, actively delivers a speech for an academic community and public and does several seminars as well on the topics of sociology, literature, art, culture, urban and dynamics of place in the society. Alver becomes an editor for a journal of sociology Sosyoloji Divanı  and holds an editorial board as well for cultural magazine Mahalle Mektabi based in Konya.

Appreciation
He started to write about literature when he was at university. His first story was published on Yedi İklim journal in 1993. He published his essays and stories in Hece and Heceöykü journals. He was actively engaged in the fields of literature sociology, novel sociology and cultural sociology.

“Köksal Alver has a refined narration. He uses a clean and simple Turkish. Love of Istanbul, love of folk songs and books can be seen in his stories. His pure and humble narration and the themes chosen from life represent Esendal. The problems of young person migrated from rural town to the city, the friendships at the city, social problems are his areas of interest.” (Necip Tosun)

“If we consider that the first thing modernity does is to dissolve the “affiliation” ties, we can see that the current age makes it possible to simultaneously conduct re-establishing affiliation ties with the concern of existence. As Köksal Alver moves with space, he determines his story at this point. The guidance of spaces caused him to be bound into “these lands” in Saklı Yara (…) The theme of Saklı Yara, the narrator and utilization of space are harmonious within this scope. Space means balance with existence.” (Ercan Yıldırım)

Works
 The Hidden Wound (Saklı Yara, story, 2004)
 Sociology of Literature (Edebiyat Sosyolojisi, editor, 2004);
 On Sociology of Literature (Edebiyat Sosyolojisi İncelemeleri, editor, 2004); 
 Sociology of Culture (Kültür Sosyolojisi, 2007); 
 The Urban Lives: Disparate Space and Secure Sites in the City (Siteril Hayatlar: Kentte Mekânsal Ayrışma ve Güvenlikli Siteler, 2007); 
 Çevgen (story, 2011);
 Urban Sociology (Kent Sosyolojisi, 2012); 
 Guide to Sociology Readings (Sosyoloji Okumaları Kılavuzu, 2012);
 Mahalle: Social and Spatial Portrait of The Neighborhood (Mahalle: Mahallenin Toplumsal ve Mekânsal Portresi, 2013);
 Excuse (Bahane, story, 2015);
 Imaginations and Things (Haller Hayaller, 2016)

References

1970 births
Turkish sociologists
Living people
People from Narman
Istanbul University alumni
Academic staff of Selçuk University
Academic journal editors